Wings (tr. Krylya) is a 1966 Soviet black and white drama film directed by Ukrainian filmmaker Larisa Shepitko, her first feature film made after graduating from the All-Russian State Institute for Cinematography. In 1979, the little known director, screenwriter and actress died in a car accident, leaving behind only a small artistic output of four films.

Plot
Forty-one-year-old Nadezhda Petrukhina (Maya Bulgakova), a once heroic World War II Soviet fighter pilot, is now living a quiet, but disappointingly ordinary life as a school principal at a construction-oriented trade school. Beloved and revered by the generation that experienced the Great Patriotic War, Nadezdha struggles to connect with the generation that followed hers. Nadezhda disapproves of her adopted daughter's choices in men, and worries that her daughter, Tanya (Zhanna Bolotova), unaware of her own adoption, might discover the truth.

Conversations between the two emphasize their tense, understated and ambiguous relationship. When Tanya encourages her mother to quit her job as school principal and begin a new life with a husband, Nadezhda responds with a cold lecture on the importance of self-sacrifice and duty to the state, values she had when she had served in the military. At the school where she works, however, Nadezhda is confronted by children who can neither appreciate the sacrifices she made during the war, nor the sacrifices she makes for them now.

Nadezdha's brief, tantalizing memories of flight, in her Yakovlev Yak-9 fighter aircraft, tumbling through clouds, are interspersed with reality and the moments of dull monotony, such as her daily commute on the bus. A visit to a local museum, where Nadezhda sees a photograph of a fellow pilot Mitya (Leonid Dyachkov), who later also became her lover during World War II, brings back memories of his final flight. Nadezdha had flown her own fighter plane alongside Mitya's when he and his plane were hit by stray gunfire. Unknown to her, he was dead at his controls as his plane gradually descended until crashing and she was unable to intercede. Her final maneuvers were to try to cause a visual disturbance in front of Mitya's crippled aircraft by rolling the wings of her own aircraft in front of his aircraft in order to jar his field of vision to consciousness but the maneuver was to no avail. Mitya's photograph, and the subsequent memory of his death in the conflict, leads Nadezhda to the local airfield.

While visiting a friend, Nadezhda has a chance to sit in one of the airfield's Yakovlev Yak-18 PM trainers. The flying instructor, her friend who recognizes and greets her. She climbs aboard a single-seat aircraft while the others put away the planes. Seated in the cockpit, Nadezhda experiences a flush of emotions as she examines the instrument panel of the aircraft. By carefully examining the instrument panel her memories are thrown back to her days as a fighter pilot and she recalls the day of her last flight with her fellow pilot Mitya. The flying instructor and his students playfully push her aircraft back to the hangar while she is seated at the controls.

As the aircraft is about to pushed into the hangar, the students are surprised when Nadezhda starts the engine. She then swings around and taxies out to the runway, with the astonished instructor and students running after her. Lifting off, her memory still flushed with emotion from her visit to the museum and seeing Mitya's photograph again, she repeats the final maneuvers she had performed in her aircraft when she tried to bring Mitya back to consciousness in the last moments of his final flight so many years ago.

Cast

Maya Bulgakova as Nadezhda Petrukhina
Zhanna Bolotova as Tanya
Panteleimon Krymov as Pavel Gavrilovich
Leonid Dyachkov as Mitya Grachov
Vladimir Gorelov as Igor
Yury Medvedev as Boris Grigoryevich
Nikolay Grabbe as Kostya Shuvalov
Zhanna Aleksandrova as Zinka
Sergei Nikonenko as Sergei Bystryakov
Rimma Markova as Shura
Arkady Trusov as Morozov
Olga Gobzeva as Journalist

Party Guests

Yevgeniy Yevstigneyev as Misha
Igor Kashintsev as Andrei
Vitaly Vulf as Party Guest
Valery Zalivin as Party Guest

Minor Characters

Vladimir Burmistrov as Cadet
Natalya Gitserot as School Secretary Natalya Maksimilyanovna
Pavel Gurov as Tailor
Pyotr Dolzhanov as Vladimir Danilovich
Maria Kravchunovskaya as Bystryakov's Neighbor
Boris Yurchenko as Sinitsin
Alevtina Rumyantseva as Museum Tour Guide (voiced by Maria Vinogradova)
Lev Vainshtein as Council Member
Ivan Turchenko as Council Member
Dmitry Nikolayev as Boy Next Door

Production
Integration of wartime Messerschmitt Bf 109 combat footage with live-action footage of Yakovlev Yak-9 fighter aircraft were used in a dream sequence.

Release
Wings was released on DVD by The Criterion Collection in 2008 through its Eclipse series as part of a box set together with The Ascent.

Reception
Film critic Paul Schrader, as well as director Ben Wheatley, chose Wings as one of their top 10 favorite Criterion releases. Critic Jonathan Rosenbaum has called it a "lovely and nuanced character study," an analysis repeated by critic Michael Koresky's description of the film as a "penetrating character study."

Critic David Sterritt wrote that it is "a remarkable movie, especially for a directorial debut," while another critic, Dave Kehr, wrote that Shepitko learned from Alexander Dovzhenko how "to bend documentary style realism to more subjective, poetic ends". Similarly, Senses of Cinema praised the film's "rich layers of meaning,"

DVD Verdict wrote that the "most astonishing thing about Wings is how young Shepitko was when she directed it. It feels like the work of an older director, one who would understand what it's like to live in the shadow of your younger self" and that much of the film's "success leans on the performance of Bulgakova, and she does deliver a phenomenal performance. On a whole, the film doesn't stand out in terms of its storytelling or cinematography, but as a sensitive human portrait, it truly is remarkable," and critic Dennis Schwartz called it a "brilliantly conceived work of art." In Sight & Sound'''s 2012 surveys of the greatest films ever made, two critics (Sergio Grmek Germani and Erica Gregor) and two directors (Carol Morley and Vlado Škafar) voted for Wings.

References

External links

Wings at the TCM Movie Database''

1966 films
Russian aviation films
Films directed by Larisa Shepitko
Films set in Russia
Mosfilm films
Russian black-and-white films
Russian drama films
1960s Russian-language films
Soviet drama films
1966 drama films
Soviet black-and-white films